The Homestead Historic District is a historic district in Homestead, Munhall, and West Homestead, Pennsylvania that was listed on the National Register of Historic Places (NRHP) in 1990. It is the site of the Homestead Strike of 1892, when the Carnegie Steel Company under the leadership of Henry Clay Frick broke the Amalgamated Association of Iron and Steel Workers union.

It includes the Homestead Pennsylvania Railroad Station, which is separately listed on the NRHP, and the Bost Building, a U.S. National Historic Landmark.

It is located close to Pittsburgh.

Gallery

References

Geography of Allegheny County, Pennsylvania
Homestead, Pennsylvania
Historic districts on the National Register of Historic Places in Pennsylvania
National Register of Historic Places in Allegheny County, Pennsylvania